Octopus is a 2000 American made-for-television horror film produced by Nu Image that premiered on the USA Network on October 11, 2000. The film stars Jay Harrington, David Beecroft and Ricco Ross.

Plot

In October 1962, during the Cuban Missile Crisis, a Soviet submarine delivers barrels of nuclear material to Cuba, and has to outrun an American submarine. When the Executive officer suggests that the submarine should slow down and identify itself, the captain shoots him. The submarine is hit by torpedoes and damaged, drowning the crew and releasing radioactive material into its nearby waters. It causes an octopus to grow into a monstrous size, attacking submarines and naval vehicles off Cuba's coasts.

In the year 2000, in Sofia, Bulgaria, two CIA officials, Roy Turner and Henry Campbell, discuss about files, before they go out for a walk. Meanwhile, someone disguised as an old woman gives a bag to an official's daughter, but the bomb inside the bag detonates, killing everyone inside the American embassy and injuring many people nearby. The two officials pursue the old woman, but the old woman's henchmen crash a car at Henry, injuring and killing him. Afterwards, Roy pursues the old woman and captures her, and she is revealed to be the leader of a terrorist group.

The terrorist is captured and taken into a submarine, but his henchmen hijack the vehicle and threaten the crew to release him. However, the submarine is attacked by the giant octopus from before.

Cast

Production
Octopus was in development as early as 1999.

Director John Eyers was approached by David Varod, Danny Lerner and Boaz Davidson of Nu Image with a treatment for the film, followed by a screenplay being developed "pretty quickly" according to Eyers. 
"My directional background has been in doing quite a bit of sci-fi, so it wasn't that much of a stretch." The film was shot in Bulgaria with a 36 day shooting time and a $5 million budget.

The octopus in the film was created through a combination of CGI, miniatures and animatronics. One of the tentacles has a 30-foot section of animatronic arm while the CGI sequences were done with a greenscreen in Bulgaria.

Release
The film was shown on television on the USA Network on October 11, 2000.

The film was released on DVD and VHS on November, 2000. By July 2000, Nu Image had already been planning for Octopus 2 which would bring the monster to New York City.

Reception
From contemporary reviews, Jerry Bokamper of the Dallas Morning News declared the film a "concomitant mess, an everything-and-the-kitchen-sink disaster.", suggesting that "If you want a sea monster movie that really sits up and barks, go back to the classics, such as The Beast From 20,000 Fathoms.
An anonymous reviewer from The Advocate-Messenger gave the film one star, stating it was a "cheesy monster flick" with "mediocre special effects, banal dialog and the predictable story line add up to a crash bore"

See also 
 List of killer octopus films

References

Sources

External links
 

2000 films
2000s English-language films
2000 television films
Films about cephalopods
Films about the Cuban Missile Crisis
Films about terrorism in Europe
Films set in 1962
Films set in 2000
Films set in Bulgaria
Giant monster films
Submarine films
2000s monster movies
American monster movies
2000 horror films
Films shot in Bulgaria
Nu Image films
American horror television films
Films produced by Boaz Davidson
Films with screenplays by Boaz Davidson
2000s American films